Patrick Lockhart is a fictional character from the television drama Days of Our Lives, portrayed by Brody Hutzler from 2004 to 2007.

Storylines
Patrick Lockhart grew up with his mother Bonnie, sister Mimi, and brother Connor on the streets (his father David had an on/off relationship with his mother). He spent most of his time protecting his family and being the man of the household. He also was a childhood conman. While unclear why, Patrick left Salem and may not have even finished high school.

Patrick made his dramatic re-entrance to Salem when Jennifer Deveraux literally ran into him with her car. They were both taken to the hospital and Jennifer felt guilty because Patrick had no insurance and no place to stay. He soon tricked Jennifer into paying his medical bills. She then offered him a home in her garage apartment, which he gratefully accepted.

Soon after, it became obvious that there was more to Patrick Lockhart than met the eye. Jennifer and all of her friends were shocked when they learned that his mother was housekeeper Bonnie Lockhart. Patrick continued to live in Jennifer's garage apartment and took care of her throughout her difficult pregnancy, even mysteriously saving the baby with the help of an antique doubloon. It was soon revealed that Patrick had been doing dealings with some sort of mobster and had been hired to come to Salem to kill Jennifer, which since he had grown attached to her, he refused to do.

When Jennifer left to find Jack Deveraux, Patrick was determined to find her. He and Hope Brady took off in a cargo plane and followed Jennifer to the remote tropical island where Tony DiMera was holding all of the "victims" of the Salem Stalker. Patrick and Hope's plane was shot down in the ocean and the two swam to shore and found all of the "dead" people of Salem. Not long after, they ended up in the jungle, where Patrick delivered Jennifer's baby, Jack Jr. They ended up in Tony's compound, where Patrick's history as a DiMera operative became clear. He even helped DiMera keep some of the Salemites hostage. When push came to shove, however, he helped his new friends escape. It was around this time that Patrick's beard fell right off his face.

Patrick returned to Salem, where he returned to his old life. He grew closer to Billie Reed and to Hope Brady, both of whom trusted him, but Bo Brady did not. He and Billie briefly hooked up, but they both seem interested in others, namely Bo & Jennifer. Patrick soon went to a place called Morgan Island and ran into Hope who had recently lost her son Zack. He comforted her and the two soon made love. While on the island Patrick admitted that he had been to the island before and that he had fallen in love with a woman named Alma Delgado and the two had plans to elope/wed and have a family. She was mysteriously gunned down before the two of them managed to run away. Patrick always felt guilty and that it was because of his dealings with the mob that had resulted in Alma's death. But with a letter found by Hope from Alma to Patrick it revealed that it was Alma's own mob dealings that had ended her life.

After returning to Salem he fell in love with Hope and tried to manipulate her into divorcing her husband. After Hope found out that she was pregnant Patrick bribed her doctor into changing test results to show that he was the father when Bo really was.
Even with the test changes, Bo and Hope began to grow closer so Patrick tried to get Hope to go away with him. Hope soon learned that Patrick was working with EJ Wells and had committed many terrible crimes including being the gloved hand and murdering officer Eve Michaels. Soon after, Patrick kidnapped Hope and took her to an abandoned warehouse where he told her that he had only got close to her on Morgan Island because he was ordered to and that now he had been ordered by E.J. to kill her. Bo soon found them and when Patrick tried to leave with Hope, her water broke. Hope then delivered a baby girl that Patrick finally admitted it was Bo's daughter. Patrick is currently in prison.

Days of Our Lives characters
Television characters introduced in 2004
Male characters in television

fi:Luettelo televisiosarjan Päivien viemää henkilöistä#Patrick Lockhart